is a private junior college in Fukuoka, Fukuoka, Japan, established in 1957. The predecessor of the school, a juku, was founded in 1948. The present name was adopted in 1959.

External links
 Official website 

Educational institutions established in 1948
Private universities and colleges in Japan
Universities and colleges in Fukuoka Prefecture
1948 establishments in Japan
Japanese junior colleges